Plaça de Sants is a Barcelona Metro station, named after the nearby Plaça de Sants, in the Sants-Montjuïc district of the city of Barcelona. The station is served by lines L1 and L5.

The two sets of platforms are linked by an underground corridor, and there are six station accesses on the Plaça de Sants and Carrer de Sants.

Plaça de Sants metro station lies some 10 minutes walk from Barcelona's main Sants railway station, which is better served by the Sants Estació metro station on lines L3 and L5.

The L1 part of the station is on the original section of line L1 (then the Ferrocarril Metropolitano Transversal de Barcelona) between Catalunya and Bordeta stations, which was opened in 1926. The L5 part was opened in 1969, along with the original section of L5 between Collblanc and Diagonal stations.

See also
List of Barcelona Metro stations

References

External links
 

Barcelona Metro line 1 stations
Barcelona Metro line 5 stations
Railway stations in Spain opened in 1926
Transport in Sants-Montjuïc
Railway stations located underground in Spain